Figure skating at the Goodwill Games was a senior international figure skating competition. It was held in July, August, or September. Medals were awarded in men's singles, ladies' singles, pair skating, and ice dancing.

Medalists

Men

Ladies

Pairs

Ice dancing

References

 
Goodwill Games
Sports at the Goodwill Games